Oliver 'Ollie' James Steele (born 15 October 1993) is an English former first-class cricketer.

Steele was born at Worcester in October 1993. He was educated in Worcester at Royal Grammar School, before going up to Collingwood College, Durham. While studying at Durham, he made six appearances in first-class cricket for Durham MCCU in 2013–15. Playing as a wicket-keeper, Steele scored a total of 175 at an average of 35.00, with a high score of 53 not out which he made against Durham in 2014.

References

External links

1993 births
Living people
Sportspeople from Worcester, England
People educated at the Royal Grammar School Worcester
Alumni of Collingwood College, Durham
English cricketers
Durham MCCU cricketers